St George's Day is a 2012 British gangster film. It is directed by Frank Harper and stars Harper, Craig Fairbrass, Charles Dance, Vincent Regan, Dexter Fletcher, Nick Moran and Keeley Hazell.

Plot
Infamous cousins Micky Mannock (Frank Harper) and Ray Collishaw (Craig Fairbrass) run London's top firm. But their supremacy in the capital's gangster underworld is threatened when they lose a drug shipment belonging to the Russian Mafia. The stakes could not be higher as they plan an audacious heist in Berlin. If successful, this could pay off their debts and set them up for life. Hiding out among an English super-firm gearing up for a massive showdown as the 3 Lions play Germany on St. George's Day, their gang have just one shot at the job. But with the cops and Russians on their trail, the last thing they need is a grass (snitch) in the ranks.

Cast
 Craig Fairbrass as Ray Collishaw
 Frank Harper as Micky Mannock
 Charles Dance as Trenchard
 Vincent Regan as Albert Ball
 Dexter Fletcher as Levi
 Nick Moran as Richard
 Keeley Hazell as Peckham Princess
 Jamie Foreman as Nixon
 Sean Pertwee as Proctor
 Luke Treadaway as William Bishop
 Ashley Walters as Kootz
 Tony Denham as Eddie Mannock
 Neil Maskell as Jimmy McCudden
 Zlatko Burić as Vladimir Sukhov
 Clemency Burton-Hill as Amelia
 Charles Venn as Lol
 Mark-John Ford as Louis
 Velibor Topić as Albanian Thug
 Angela Gots as Ellie Collishaw
 Susan Fordham as Undercover Police
 Ludger Pistor as Werner Voss
 Joe Montana as Jack
 Hetti Bywater as Lol's Girlfriend
 Ronnie Fox as Klash
 Davinia Taylor as Sarah
 Peter Vollebregt as Jan Van Dorn
 Sura Dohnke as Hannah
 Faye Tozer as Police Woman
 Faruk Pruti as Russian 1
 Robert Cambrinus as Anthony Forker
 Hannah Blamires as Clubber
 Michael Suluk as Tiny
 Tommy McDonnell as Joe Collishaw
 Craig Henderson as Dillan
 Sarah Weatherstone as Zoe
 Dominic Burke as Police Forensic Officer (as Dom Burke)
 Julie Vollono as Ferry Passenger
 Scott Bradley as German Hooligan
 Timothy J. Murphy as Police Officer
 Christian Weathersone as Ellie's son
 Elodie Hill as Ellie's daughter
 Russell Balogh as Dutch Hooligan (uncredited)
 James Michael Rankin as German Thug (uncredited)
 Deborah Rosan as Lol's Family – Funeral Scene (uncredited)
 Chris Wilson as Restaurant Owner (uncredited)
 Tommy Penfold as Barman
 Dwain Stephens as Black Waiter
 Louisa Martin as Graveside Choir member (uncredited)

Release and reception
The premiere of the film took place at the Odeon in Covent Garden, London on 29 August 2012. The premiere was attended by stars of the film, such as Frank Harper, Craig Fairbrass, Keeley Hazell and Tony Denham, and other actors, such as Bruce Payne. The general release of the film took place on 7 September 2012. The film has received mixed reviews. The film has a rating of four out of five on Time Out's London magazine website while The Daily Telegraph gave it a rating of two out of five and The Independent gave it a rating of one out of five. One reviewer stated that Harper just about pulls off the 'globe-hopping plot involving gangsters, drug deals, heists and more than a touch of double-crossing betrayal' and that whilst the film is 'sometimes predictable, it's never dull, with a fast-paced plot and a terrific cast'. Phelim O'Neill, who reviewed the film for The Guardian, stated that 'it's a low-budget film with enough ambition to take the action overseas, and it's nicely shot'.
Joanna Ebuwa, who reviewed the film for Britflicks, stated that 'this is the best British gangster film since Lock, Stock & Two Smoking Barrels, it's thoroughly entertaining, funny, nostalgic and pokes fun at the police and the establishment. Harper has been studying from Guy Richie and is definitely one to watch'. John Parrot, who reviewed the film for The Film Review stated that 'St George's Day is so excessive, rude and genuinely Cockney that it may become a cult movie'. In contrast, Stephen Kelly of Total Film stated that 'not even the formidable presence of Charles Dance can salvage a script this woeful'.

References

External links
 
 

2012 films
2012 crime drama films
2010s heist films
British crime drama films
British gangster films
British heist films
Films set in Amsterdam
Films set in Berlin
Films set in London
Films set in Los Angeles
2012 directorial debut films
2010s English-language films
2010s British films